Daniëlle Marloes Braat (born 6 April 1990) is a Dutch cricketer who plays as a right-arm medium bowler. She has played for the Netherlands since 2006, including appearing for the side in their only Test match. Her younger brother, Sebastiaan Braat, has represented the Dutch men's team.

In October 2021, she was named in the Dutch team for the 2021 Women's Cricket World Cup Qualifier tournament in Zimbabwe.

References

External links
 
 

1990 births
Living people
People from Vlaardingen
Dutch women cricketers
Netherlands women Test cricketers
Netherlands women One Day International cricketers
Netherlands women Twenty20 International cricketers
Sportspeople from South Holland
20th-century Dutch women
21st-century Dutch women